Lường Thị Thảo (born 11 May 1999) is a Vietnamese rower. She competed in the women's lightweight double sculls event at the 2020 Summer Olympics.

References

External links
 

1999 births
Living people
Vietnamese female rowers
Olympic rowers of Vietnam
Rowers at the 2020 Summer Olympics
Place of birth missing (living people)
Asian Games gold medalists for Vietnam
Asian Games medalists in rowing
Rowers at the 2018 Asian Games
Medalists at the 2018 Asian Games
21st-century Vietnamese women
20th-century Vietnamese women